In hydrodynamics, a plume or a column is a vertical body of one fluid moving through another.  Several effects control the motion of the fluid, including momentum (inertia), diffusion and buoyancy (density differences).  Pure jets and pure plumes define flows that are driven entirely by momentum and buoyancy effects, respectively.  Flows between these two limits are usually described as forced plumes or buoyant jets.  "Buoyancy is defined as being positive" when, in the absence of other forces or initial motion, the entering fluid would tend to rise.  Situations where the density of the plume fluid is greater than its surroundings (i.e. in still conditions, its natural tendency would be to sink), but the flow has sufficient initial momentum to carry it some distance vertically, are described as being negatively buoyant.

Movement
Usually, as a plume moves away from its source, it widens because of entrainment of the surrounding fluid at its edges. Plume shapes can be influenced by flow in the ambient fluid (for example, if local wind blowing in the same direction as the plume results in a co-flowing jet). This usually causes a plume which has initially been 'buoyancy-dominated' to become 'momentum-dominated' (this transition is usually predicted by a dimensionless number called the Richardson number).

Flow and detection 
A further phenomenon of importance is whether a plume has laminar flow or turbulent flow. Usually, there is a transition from laminar to turbulent as the plume moves away from its source. This phenomenon can be clearly seen in the rising column of smoke from a cigarette. When high accuracy is required, computational fluid dynamics (CFD) can be employed to simulate plumes, but the results can be sensitive to the turbulence model chosen. CFD is often undertaken for rocket plumes, where condensed phase constituents can be present in addition to gaseous constituents. These types of simulations can become quite complex, including afterburning and thermal radiation, and (for example) ballistic missile launches are often detected by sensing hot rocket plumes. 

Spacecraft designers are sometimes concerned with impingement of attitude control system thruster plumes onto sensitive subsystems like solar arrays and star trackers, or with the impingement of rocket engine plumes onto moon or planetary surfaces where they can cause local damage or even mid-term disturbances to planetary atmospheres.

Another phenomenon which can also be seen clearly in the flow of smoke from a cigarette is that the leading-edge of the flow, or the starting-plume, is quite often approximately in the shape of a ring-vortex (smoke ring).

Types
Pollutants released to the ground can work their way down into the groundwater, leading to groundwater pollution. The resulting body of polluted water within an aquifer is called a plume, with its migrating edges called plume fronts. Plumes are used to locate, map, and measure water pollution within the aquifer's total body of water, and plume fronts to determine directions and speed of the contamination's spreading in it.

Plumes are of considerable importance in the atmospheric dispersion modelling of air pollution. A classic work on the subject of air pollution plumes is that by Gary Briggs.

A thermal plume is one which is generated by gas rising above a heat source. The gas rises because thermal expansion makes warm gas less dense than the surrounding cooler gas.

Simple plume modeling
Simple modelling will enable many properties of fully developed, turbulent plumes to be investigated. Many of the classic scaling arguments were developed in a combined analytic and laboratory study described in an influential paper by Bruce Morton, G.I. Taylor and Stewart Turner and this and subsequent work is described in the popular monograph of Stewart Turner.

 It is usually sufficient to assume that the pressure gradient is set by the gradient far from the plume (this approximation is similar to the usual Boussinesq approximation).
 The distribution of density and velocity across the plume are modelled either with simple Gaussian distributions or else are taken as uniform across the plume (the so-called 'top hat' model).
 The rate of entrainment into the plume is proportional to the local velocity.  Though initially thought to be a constant, recent work has shown that the entrainment coefficient varies with the local Richardson number.  Typical values for the entrainment coefficient are of about 0.08 for vertical jets and 0.12 for vertical, buoyant plumes whilst for bent-over plumes, the entrainment coefficient is about 0.6.
 Conservation equations for mass (including entrainment), and momentum and buoyancy fluxes are sufficient for a complete description of the flow in many cases. For a simple rising plume these equations predict that the plume will widen at a constant half-angle of about 6 to 15 degrees.

Gaussian plume modelling
Gaussian plume models can be used in several fluid dynamics scenarios to calculate concentration distribution of solutes, such as a smoke stack release or contaminant released in a river. Gaussian distributions are established by Fickian diffusion, and follow a Gaussian (bell-shaped) distribution. For calculating the expected concentration of a one dimensional instantaneous point source we consider a mass  released at an instantaneous point in time, in a one dimensional domain along . This will give the following equation:

This  equation makes the following four assumptions:

 The mass  is released instantaneously.
 The mass  is released in an infinite domain.
 The mass spreads only through diffusion.
 Diffusion does not vary in space.

Gallery

See also

 Air pollution dispersion terminology
 Atmospheric dispersion modeling
 Bibliography of atmospheric dispersion modeling
 Cryovolcano
 Enceladus – moon of planet Saturn
 Eruption column

References

Fluid dynamics
Aquifers
Water pollution
Atmospheric dispersion modeling